Adomaitis is the masculine form of a Lithuanian family name.  It means "son of Adomas (Adam)". Its feminine forms  are: Adomaitienė (married woman or widow) and Adomaitytė (unmarried woman).

The surname may refer to:
 Dainius Adomaitis (born 1974), Lithuanian basketball player and coach
 Juozas Adomaitis-Šernas (1859–1922), Lithuanian scientific writer
 Linas Adomaitis (born 1976), Lithuanian musician
 Regimantas Adomaitis (1937–2022), Lithuanian movie and stage actor

See also 
 Adomeit

References 

Lithuanian-language surnames